Fishbourne railway station serves the village of Fishbourne, West Sussex, England.

The London, Brighton and South Coast Railway (LB&SCR) opened the station at Fishbourne on 1 April 1906. It is located on the West Coastway Line that runs between Brighton and Southampton. The station is roughly half a mile walk from Fishbourne Roman Palace. Just east of this station at Fishbourne Crossing the single track veered off for the branch line between Chichester and Midhurst.

Facilities 
Fishbourne station is unstaffed and tickets must be purchased from the self-service ticket machine at the station entrance. The station has seated areas and passenger help points on both platforms.

Step-free access is available to both platforms at the station.

Services 
All services at Fishbourne are operated by Southern using  and  EMUs.

The typical off-peak service in trains per hour is:

 1 tph to 
 1 tph to 

The typical service on Sundays is:

 1 tph to Brighton via Worthing
 1 tph to Portsmouth Harbour

Gallery

References

External links 

Fishbourne
Railway stations in West Sussex
DfT Category F1 stations
Former London, Brighton and South Coast Railway stations
Railway stations in Great Britain opened in 1906
Railway stations served by Govia Thameslink Railway
1906 establishments in England